Takht-e-Soleiman ('Throne of Solomon'), or variant spellings, may refer to:

 Takht-e Soleymān, an archaeological site in West Azerbaijan, Iran
 Takht-e Suleyman Massif, a subrange of central Alborz mountains, Iran
 Mount Takht-e Suleyman, a mountain
 Takht-e Soleyman District, in Takab County, West Azerbaijan, Iran
 Takht-e Soleyman, Fars, a city in Iran
 Takht-e-Sulaiman, a mountain in the Federally Administered Tribal Areas of Pakistan
 Qasre Abunasr, or Takht-e Sulayman, the site of an ancient settlement in Shiraz, Fars province, Iran

See also
 Throne of Solomon, a motif in Judaism, Christianity and Islam
 Sulayman Mountain, in Kyrgyzstan
 Sulaiman Mountains, in the southern Hindu Kush mountain system in Afghanistan and Pakistan